The coat of arms of Albania (Albanian: Stema e Republikës së Shqipërisë) is an adaptation of the Flag of Albania and is based on the symbols of Gjergj Kastrioti Skanderbeg. It features the black double-headed eagle, documented in official use since 1458, as evidenced from a sealed document uncovered in the Vatican Secret Archive (fund: Miscellanea, vol. XXXIX, doc. 2398), addressed to Pope Pius II and co-sealed by notary Johannes Borcius de Grillis. 
The stylized gold helmet is partially based on the model of crown-like rank that once belonged to Skanderbeg, currently on display at the Kunsthistorisches Museum in Vienna, first mentioned in 1593 in the Ambras armory inventory and depicted in 1601/03 in the "Armamentarium Heroicum" of Jakob Schrenck von Notzing. The ruler of Austria, Ferdinand II, acquired the helmet from the Duke of Urbino, so mentioned in a letter sent to him from the duke, dated 15 October 1578.

The helmet as an integral component in the coat of arms was instituted for the first time by the president of the republic Ahmet Zogu on 12 July 1926.

Official regulation
The coat of arms of the Republic is described in Article 14 of the Constitution of Albania: 

The design is further specified in articles VII and VIII of Law 8926:

Expanded usage
The expanded usage of the coat of arms of the Republic is explained by decision no. 474 of the Council of Ministers, dated 10 July 2003.

The usage of the coat of arms of the Republic, is later included in the Official Ceremonial, approved by decision no. 229, dated 23 April 2004 which states:

Conception of the double-headed eagle

Significance of the helmet

Skanderbeg’s helmet is mentioned, along with two swords, in the inventory of the Ambras Castle armory in 1593, inherited by Archduke Ferdinand II and in the catalogue known as 'Armamentarium Heroicum' published in 1601 by Jakob Schrenk von Notzing. From one of 125 portraits of European princes in plates engraved by Dominicus Custos, after designs by Giovanni Battista Fontana, Skanderbeg is shown with the helmet and a sword. The plates were accompanied with a text by Schrenk von Notzing giving a brief profile of the subject. Archduke Ferdinand had himself led a campaign against the Ottomans in Hungary in 1556 at the behest of his father, Holy Roman Emperor Ferdinand I, so it was not perhaps surprising that he would want to include the arms of Skanderbeg in his collection.

In 1605, Ambras Castle was sold to the Austrian Emperor, and in 1806 the arms were transferred to Belvedere Palace and then finally, in 1888, to the Kunsthistorisches Museum in Vienna. In recent years, the arms have been the subject of study by the Museum’s curator, Matthias Pfaffenbichler.

The iron forged helmet is likely of Italian origin, thought to have been made around 1460. The lower part of the helmet and the neck protection are missing and cracks in the base have been covered by a sewn leather band under which are traces of the original silk. A copper band with gold plated border is adorned with six rosettes, most of which are 16th century restorations, though the one at the back dates to the 15th century. Between the rosettes, an inscription in a particular type of Gothic minuscule on a hatched ground reads ‘in/per/ra/to/re/bt’.

Skënder Anamali, an archaeologist and scholar on medieval history, has proposed that the decorative band with the inscription and the rosettes were added by Skanderbeg's descendants. The initials of the inscription are usually rendered as Jezus Nazarenus /Principi Emathie /Regi Albaniae * Terrori Osmanorum * Regi Epirotarum * Benedictat Te which translate as Jesus of Nazareth Blesses Thee Prince of Emathia, King (or Kingdom) of Albania, Terror of the Ottomans, King (or Kingdom) of Epirus. Such titles, however, were not used during Skanderbeg’s lifetime.

Pfaffenbichler’s close inspection of the inscription confirms the view that it was added to the helmet after Skanderbeg’s lifetime. The transverse part of the letter ‘t’ is from a calligraphic font called Fraktur, developed by Wolfgang Spitzberg, the scribe of the Chancellery, and used for the first time around 1500. Fraktur only appeared in wider use from 1517, about 50 years after the death of Skanderbeg. Therefore, it is reasonable to conclude that the decorative band with its inscription are not original – though one of the rosettes dating to the 15th century may possibly have been a replacement of an original fitting. 

The helmet is distinguished for its goat's head crest. There are a number of theories explaining the association of the goat’s head with Skanderbeg. One such theory is that it relates to the rams’ horns, a symbol of Zeus Ammon, worn by Alexander the Great, who was Epirote by descent from his mother Olympias. The famed King of Epirus, Pyrrhus, also wore a helmet that had, according to Plutarch, a “towering crest and … goat's horns”.

The goat's head is partially hammered in copper, engraved and gold plated. The eye sockets that today are empty would have been inlaid. The shape of the crest hole on top of the helmet does not precisely mold into the shape needed for the goat's head crest so the two parts may have not originally gone together.

Inconsistencies with the design

State coats of arms
{| class="wikitable"; style=font-size:85%; width="75%"
! Coat of arms
! Description 
|-
| align="center"|Great ArmsDiplomatic Seal
| The earliest usage of state symbols is prescribed in the Organic Statute of Albania, drafted by the International Commission of Control.

Chapter II, titled "The sovereign", in articles 7 and 18 states:

The official newspaper of the Albanian government, Perlindja e Shqipëniës, in its opening page article titled "Speech of the King's in-law – Royal Court – Crown of Albania", dated 28 February 1914, gives an elaborate depiction of the coat of arms:

An illustration of the coat of arms was published for the first time in an article by Eberhard Freiherr von Wechmar in the weekly illustrated newspaper Die Woche (1914), issue no. 10, p. 387. The extract from german reads:

The coat of arms is once more featured in the form of a diplomatic seal on a royal invitation letter addressed to captain N. Thomson, the brother of Lt. Colonel L.W.Thomson.
It bears the prince's coat of arms and that of the family of princess Sophie, both under the Albanian crown.
|-
| align="center"|Gold ModelSilver Model
| The Coat of Arms of the Albanian Republic was introduced by decree-law "On the state coats of arms and official flags", dated 12 July 1926:

 
Teki Selenica's encyclopedic guide book Shqipria më 1927, e illustruar (p. 125) provides an illustration of the coat of arms whereby the helm with the arms and banners is displayed in silver profile. The usage of the silver model is reaffirmed in official documents of the Ministry of Internal Affairs' secret office from the late fall of 1929.
|-
| align="center"|
| A decree-law in reference to the new Coat of Arms of the State was published in Fletorja Zyrtare, dated 14 August 1929 (p. 7–8). The redaction is from the original print using a form of old gheg, conventional for the time:

DECREES:
The approval and implementation of the Decree-law on the Coat of Arms and Flags of the State.

Tirana, 8 August  1929.
ZOG d. v.
|-
| align="center"|Great ArmsLesser Arms
| On 3 June 1939, his Majesty the King Emperor, surrounded by his civil and military entourage, placed the «Constitutional Charter» into the hands of the President of the Ministerial Council, Vërlaci, expressing the paternal solicitude and affection for the Albanian people which inspired his determination. The said "Charter", made up of 54 articles grouped into 7 Titles, makes no mention yet of a coat of arms.

The arms of the Kingdom of Albania were promulgated by royal decree nr. 141, dated 28 September 1939. Summarized in seven article paragraphs, they are described as follows:

 The greater arms is used: in the great seal of the State, on solemn occasions and in monumental decorations.

The lesser arms is used by the state administration.
|-
| 
| Article 95 of the Statute of the People's Republic of Albania (1946) describes the state emblem as follows: 

Article 107 of the Constitution of the People's Socialist Republic of Albania (1976) maintains the same design phraseology as its precursor although expressed in a whole condensed sentence:  Designed by acclaimed painter Sadik Kaceli, the emblem was initially adopted on 14 March 1946. It was readopted with minor amendments on 28 December 1976.

The shapes of the emblem have undergone several changes over the decades and are explained in chronological order below:

Model (3): This image of the emblem is found in the Constitution of the People's Republic of Albania published in 1964 by the Albanian Committee for Cultural Relations and Friendship with Foreign Countries. The interweaving of the wheat stems is shown in right profile, meanwhile the wreaths are simplified in the shape of a rhombus or lozenge. The eagle's chest comes forth in a triangle-like posture, the minuscule eyes are rounded and there is a widening of the claws. The overall color scheme is lightly faded. 

Model (4): The emblem shown here was published by the nationally syndicated satire magazine Hosteni in its 1st issue of the 39th annual edition (956), dated 12 January 1983. The lifelike image was used in the 500 L commemorative gold coin from 1969. A matching illustration of the emblem is featured on the cover page of the 1st issue, 27th annual edition, of the military magazine "10 Korriku" (1973).

Model (5): Unlike with previous models, the wreath shown here is olive in color and appears more rounded, attuned to its soviet counterpart. Interestingly, the shape of the eagle is almost identical to the model found in the 1998 coat of arms. This exact emblem is seen in the 10 L silver coin minted in 1990. The only difference being the word MAJ which is printed as MAI, suggesting that it was likely reproduced in Italy.

Model (6): The model of the emblem generally accepted as the official variant was pubished by "Albania today", a political and informative review, in its 1st issue (32) of the 7th annual edition (1977). This model has been used in banknotes and fiscal stamps since 1947.

On 7 April 1992, the Assembly formed after the early elections, in its afternoon session, voted to remove the communist emblem as the official symbol of the state including the removal of the star from the country's flag and established a parliamentary commission tasked with studying the proposal of a new emblem of the state.
|-
| align="center"|
| During the plenary session of 13 November 1992, members of the Assembly, having previously abolished the use of communist symbols as official representative symbols of the state, decided to adopt a new coat of arms of the Republic.

Under proposal was the amendment of law no. 7491, dated 25.04.1991, "On the Main Constitutional Provisions" which propagated the inclusion of a new chapter titled "Flag, Coat of Arms and The Capital".

Article 3 of the chapter, as read by the secretary of the assembly, stated the following: {{Cquote|quote="The coat of arms of the Republic of Albania displays a black double-headed eagle placed on an escutcheon, a varriated type shield in red color. The shield is to have a straight line on top, that comes narrowing at the bottom. On top of the shield are written the words: Republika e Shqipërisë".
|source=Law no. 7491, dated 25.04.1991,  Article 3: "§ Flag, Coat of Arms and The Capital"}}

After several discussions and with no objections, the chairman of the assembly Pjetër Arbnori took the microphone to announce that article 3 was approved unanimously.

The image of the coat of arms is found in various documents of the state archive and was once suspended at the main  curtain wall in front of the rostrum of the national assembly.
|-
|}

See also
 Armorial of Albania
 Flag of Albania (list)''

References

National symbols of Albania
Albania
Albania
Albania